The 1927 Giro d'Italia was the 15th edition of the Giro d'Italia, a Grand Tour organized and sponsored by the newspaper La Gazzetta dello Sport. The race was won by Alfredo Binda of the Legnano team. Second and third respectively were the Italian riders Giovanni Brunero and Antonio Negrini.

266 riders started the race, and 80 crossed the finish line of the final stage.

It was the first Giro with a modern design: in the same period of time of the previous Giro, three more stages were included, which replaced three days of rest. At the same time the stages became shorter (only one passed 300 km).

In 1927 Binda was at the apex of its career, and it triumphed winning 12 stages out of 15: a record still to be surpassed. Binda led the general classification from the first to the last stage (only Girardengo had already done it, in the 1919 Giro). In Binda's team there was also his brother Albino, as a support rider.

Giovanni Rossignoli, "virtual" winner of the first edition in 1909, participated for the last time. He was 45 years old and concluded the race in 44th place, about 7 hours behind Binda.

Participants

Of the 266 riders that began the Giro d'Italia on 15 May, 80 of them made it to the finish in Milan on 6 June. Riders were allowed to ride on their own or as a member of a team. There were six teams that competed in the race: Aliprandi-Pirelli, Bianchi-Pirelli, Berettini-Hutchinson, Ganna-Dunlop, Legnano-Pirelli, and Wolsit-Pirelli.

The peloton was primarily composed of Italians. The field featured three former Giro d'Italia champions in three-time winner and reigning champion Giovanni Brunero, along with one-time winners Alfredo Binda and Giuseppe Enrici. Other notable Italian riders that started the race included Arturo Bresciani, Giovanni Rossignoli, and Domenico Piemontesi.

Final standings

Stage results

General classification

There were 80 cyclists who had completed all fifteen stages. For these cyclists, the times they had needed in each stage was added up for the general classification. The cyclist with the least accumulated time was the winner. Aristide Cavallini won the prize for best ranked independent rider in the general classification.

Notes

References

Giro d'Italia by year
Giro Ditalia, 1927
Giro Ditalia, 1927
Giro d'Italia
Giro d'Italia